Qahtan Salih Mahdi al-Kinani better known by his artistic name as Qahtan al-Attar (born September 14, 1950) is an Iraqi singer, songwriter, musician. He is known as el-Andaleeb el-Muhajer.

Early life 
al-Attar was born in Ali al-Gharbi district, Maysan, Iraq on September 14, 1950. his family moved to Baghdad where he started his musical career in a talent show called rukn al-huwwat.

References

1950 births
Living people
20th-century Iraqi male singers
People from Maysan Governorate
Iraqi male singer-songwriters